Paul Chang-Ha Lim (born April 29, 1967) an American ecclesiastical historian who serves as professor of church history at Vanderbilt University Divinity School. His main research involves the intellectual history and historical theology of Reformation and post-Reformation England.

Life and education 
Born on April 29, 1967, in South Korea, Lim received a Bachelor of Arts degree in economics at Yale University in 1990, followed by a Master of Divinity degree at Biblical Theological Seminary in 1995. He earned a Master of Theology degree at Princeton Theological Seminary in 1997 and a Doctor of Philosophy degree in the field of history of Christianity at the University of Cambridge in 2001.

Lim taught a historical and systematic theology at Gordon-Conwell Theological Seminary for five years. He is now teaching the intellectual history and historical theology of the Reformation and post-Reformation England. He is writing a book dealing with books relating with Reformation theology and social justice.

Reformation history 
Lim is known for his work on Richard Baxter, the celebrated seventeenth-century English Puritan. From 2001 until 2006 he taught at Gordon–Conwell Theological Seminary in South Hamilton, Massachusetts. For his book, Mystery Unveiled: The Crisis of the Trinity in Early Modern England (Oxford, 2012), Lim was awarded the 2013 Roland H. Bainton Prize as the best book in history/theology published in 2012.

Jonathan Sheehan at UC Berkeley writes, "Paul Lim's erudite book demonstrates just how challenging it was when, during the English seventeenth century, Christianity's central mystery of the Trinity moved to the center of political, cultural, and religious controversies. With enormous theological and scriptural learning, Lim lets us see these controversies from the inside."

Lim has also received a Luce Fellowship in Theology, a Louisville Institute Research Grant, and a Vanderbilt Research Scholars Grant for his scholarship.

Works 

 Mystery Unveiled: The Crisis of the Trinity in Early Modern England (Oxford University Press, August 2012)
 In Pursuit of Purity, Unity and Liberty: Richard Baxter's Puritan Ecclesiology in Its Seventeenth-century Context (Brill, 2004)
 The Cambridge Companion to Puritanism (Cambridge, 2008)
 “Not Solely Sola Scriptura, or, a Rejoinder to Brad S. Gregory’s The Unintended Reformation,” in Journal of Medieval and Early Modern Studies 46:3 (September, 2016): 555- 82.
 “‘But to know it as we shoul’d do’: Enthusiasm, Historicizing of the Charismata, and Cessationism in Enlightenment England,” in The Spirit, the Affections, and the Christian Tradition, eds., Amos Yong and Dale Coulter. Notre Dame, IN: University of Notre Dame Press, 2016, pp. 231-57.
 “The Platonic Captivity of Primitive Christianity and the Enlightening of Augustine,” in God in the Enlightenment, eds. William J. Bulman and Robert G. Ingram. New York: Oxford University Press, 2016, pp. 136–56.
 “Reformed Theology in North America,” in The Oxford Handbook of Reformed Theology, eds. Michael Allen and Scott McSwain. Oxford: Oxford University Press, 2016
 forthcoming. “Herbert, Edward (Lord of Cherbury),” and “King James I and VI,” in Encyclopedia of the Bible and Its Reception (Berlin: Water de Gruyter, 2009–16). Vol. 11, pp. 830–31, and Vol. 16, pp. tbd.
 “Corinth, Calvin and Calcutta: Trinity, Trafficking and Transformation of Theologia,” in Ex Auditu: An International Journal of Theological Interpretation of Scripture, ed., Klyne Snodgrass vol. 30 (2014): 117–31.
 “Introduction,” and “Puritans and the Church of England: Historiography and Ecclesiology,” in Cambridge Companion to Puritanism, eds. John Coffey and Paul Lim. Cambridge: Cambridge University Press, 2008, pp. 1–18, 223–40.
 “Hypothetical Universalism and Real Calvinism in Seventeenth-century England,” Reformation 13 (2009): 193–204. “Adiaphora, Ecclesiology and Reformation: John Owen’s Theology of Religious Toleration in Context,” in Persecution and Pluralism: Calvinists and Religious Minorities in Early Modern Europe 1550–1700, eds. Richard Bonney and D.J.B. Trim. Bern: Peter Lang, 2006, pp. 243– 72.
 A Response to Timothy S. Lee's “Beleaguered Success: How Korean Evangelicalism Fared in the 1990s,” in The Religion & Culture Web Forum, under the auspices of the Martin Marty Center, Institute for the Advanced Study of Religion, the University of Chicago. http://marty-center.uchicago.edu/webforum/archive.shtml “John Bunyan,” *“John of the Cross,” “Cyril of Jerusalem,” “Bartolomé de Las Casas,” “Abraham Kuyper,” “William Laud,” “Moïse Amyraut,” in Cambridge Dictionary of Christianity, ed. Daniel Patte. Cambridge: Cambridge University Press, 2010, s.v. P.C.H. Lim / C.V. AUGUST 2017 4
 “The Reformed Pastor of Richard Baxter,” in Devoted Life: An Invitation to Puritan Classics, ed. Randall Gleason and Kelly Kapic. Downers Grove, IL: InterVarsity Press, 2004, pp. 224– 43.
 “Henry Bartlett,” “Samuel Wells,” “Benjamin Woodbridge,” “John Woodbrige,” in the Oxford Dictionary of National Biography, ed. Brian Harrison. Oxford: Oxford University Press, 2004,
 s.v. “Richard Baxter,” in The Dictionary of Historical Theology, ed. Trevor Hart. Grand Rapids, MI: Eerdmans, 2000,
 s.v. REVIEWS Review of Robert Strivens, Philip Doddridge and the Shaping of Evangelical Dissent. Aldershot: Ashgate, 2015. XVII-XVIII Revue de la Société d’études Anglo-Américaines des XVIIe et XVIIIe siècles 73 (2016): 302–5.
 Review of Sarah Mortimer, Reason and Religion in the English Revolution: the Challenge of the Socinians. Cambridge: Cambridge University Press, 2010. Journal of Ecclesiastical History 64 (2013): 855–57.
 Review of Alistair Dougalss, The Devil's Book: Charles I, the Book of Sports, and Puritanism in Tudor and Early Stuart England. Exeter: Exeter University Press, 2011. Journal of British Studies 52 (2013): 755–57.
 Review of Stefania Tutino, Thomas White and the Blackoists: Between Politics and Theology during the English Civil War. Burlington, VT: Ashgate, 2008. American Historical Review 115 (2010): 605–6.
 Review of Karen E. Spierling, Infant Baptism in Reformation Geneva: The Shaping of a Community, 1536–1564. Burlington, VT: Ashgate, 2005. Sixteenth Century Journal 37 (2007): 469–70.
 Review of Christopher Ocker, Biblical Poetics before Humanism and Reformation. Cambridge: Cambridge University Press, 2002. Scottish Journal of Theology 60 (2006): 478–80.
 Review of Stephen Edmondson, Calvin's Christology. Cambridge: Cambridge University Press, 2004. Sixteenth Century Journal 37 (2006): 798–99. Review of Susannah Brietz Monta, Martyrdom and Literature in Early Modern England. Cambridge: Cambridge University Press, 2005. Sixteenth Century Journal 37 (2006): 1113- 14.
 Review of Mark Taplin, The Italian Reformers and the Zurich Church, c. 1540–1620. Burlington, VT: Ashgate, 2003. Sixteenth Century Journal 36 (2005): 1101–03.
 Review of Donald K. McKim, The Cambridge Companion to John Calvin. Cambridge: Cambridge University Press, 2004. Sixteenth Century Journal 36 (2005): 1139–41.
 Review of Alexandra Walsham, Providence in Early Modern England. Oxford: Oxford University Press, 1999. Fides et Historia 32 (2000): 154–57.
 Review of Janice Knight, Orthodoxies in Massachusetts: Rereading American Puritanism. Cambridge, MA: Harvard University Press, 1997. Westminster Theological Journal 62 (2000): 326–30.

References

External links 
 Paul Lim, Vanderbilt Divinity School

1967 births
Living people
Vanderbilt University faculty
American Calvinist and Reformed theologians
Princeton Theological Seminary alumni
Yale University alumni
Alumni of the University of Cambridge
American people of Korean descent
American theologians
21st-century Christians
Presidents of the American Society of Church History